The 2001 European Amateur Team Championship took place 3–7 July at Ljunghusen Golf Club in Höllviken, Sweden. It was the 22nd men's golf European Amateur Team Championship.

Venue 

The club was founded in 1932 and by 1965 it was the first golf club in Scandinavia to feature 27 holes, one of three clubs with links courses at the south west tip of Sweden, in Vellinge Municipality, Scania County. The championship was played at holes 1–18, set up with par 71 (after the tournament changed to 72).

Format 
Each team consisted of six players, playing two rounds of an opening stroke-play qualifying competition over two days, counting the five best scores each day for each team.

The eight best teams formed flight A, in knock-out match-play over the next three days. The teams were seeded based on their positions after the stroke play. The first placed team were drawn to play the quarter final against the eight placed team, the second against the seventh, the third against the sixth and the fourth against the fifth. Teams were allowed to use six players during the team matches, selecting four of them in the two morning foursome games and five players in to the afternoon single games. Games all square at the 18th hole were declared halved, if the team match was already decided. The elimination matches and the bronze match were decided with one foursome game and four single games.

The eight teams placed 9–16 in the qualification stroke-play formed flight B and the seven teams placed 17–23 formed flight C, to play similar knock-out play, with one foursome game and four single games in each match, to decide their final positions.

Teams 
A record number of 23 nation teams contested the event. A team representing Slovenia took part in the championship for the first time. Each team consisted of six players.

Players in the leading teams

Other participating teams

Winners 
Eight-time-winners team England won the opening 36-hole competition, with a 25-under-par score of 685, 14 strokes ahead of team Ireland on 2nd place and host nation Sweden another eight strokes behind. Neither former champions Spain or two-times-silver medalists France did make it to the quarter finals, finishing ninth and tied tenth respectively.

There was no official award for the lowest individual score, but individual leader was Rickard Sundgren, Sweden, with an 11-under-par score of 131, two strokes ahead of Nick Dougherty, England. Sundgren was a substitute player, replacing Anders Hultman in the Swedish team just before the start of the tournament.

Luke Donald, England shot a new course record, with an 8-under-par-score of 63 in his first 18-hole round, including 8 birdies and 10 par.

Team Scotland won the gold medal, earning their fifth title, beating team Ireland in the final 5–2.

Team England earned the bronze on third place, after beating Iceland 4–1 in the bronze match. Iceland reached the semi finals for the first time in the history of the championship, after beating host nation Sweden in the quarter finals.

Results 
Qualification round

Team standings

* Note: In the event of a tie the order was determined by the best total of the two non-counting scores of the two rounds.

Individual leaders

 Note: There was no official award for the lowest individual score.

Flight A

Bracket

Final games

* Note: Game declared halved, since team match already decided.

Flight B

Bracket

Flight C

Bracket

Final standings

Sources:

See also 
 European Golf Association – Organizer of European amateur golf championships
 Eisenhower Trophy – biennial world amateur team golf championship for men organized by the International Golf Federation.
 European Ladies' Team Championship – European amateur team golf championship for women organised by the European Golf Association.

References

External links 
 European Golf Association: Full results

European Amateur Team Championship
Golf tournaments in Sweden
European Amateur Team Championship
European Amateur Team Championship
European Amateur Team Championship